St Ninian's Cave is a cave in Physgill Glen, Whithorn, Dumfries and Galloway, Scotland. It features in the climax of the acclaimed 1973 horror film The Wicker Man. It is a place of Roman Catholic pilgrimage by way of its association with the Scottish saint Ninian.

Excavations in the cave in the 1880s and the 1950s uncovered a collection of early medieval carved stones. There were 18 in total, most of them built into a post-medieval wall, others lying loose in the cave's interior or at its mouth.

Rockfalls near the entrance have diminished the size of the cave over time, as seen at right.

References

See also 

 Burrow Head

Geography of Dumfries and Galloway
Articles with OS grid coordinates
Wigtownshire